Resnova is a genus of bulbous perennials in the family Asparagaceae, subfamily Scilloideae, tribe Hyacintheae, subtribe Massoniinae, and  found in South Africa.

Species 
 Resnova humifusa
 Resnova lachenalioides
 Resnova maxima
 Resnova minor
 Resnova pilosa

References

External links 
 

Scilloideae
Flora of Southern Africa
Asparagaceae genera